Francisco Sebastián Ramírez (born 4 September 2000) is an Argentine professional footballer who plays as a midfielder for San Martín SJ, on loan from Huracán.

Club career
Ramírez made his professional debut with Huracán in a 1-1 Argentine Primera División tie with Gimnasia y Esgrima on 31 January 2020.

On 15 January 2022, Ramírez joined San Martín de San Juan on a loan deal until the end of 2022.

References

External links

2000 births
Living people
Sportspeople from Buenos Aires Province
Argentine footballers
Association football midfielders
Argentine Primera División players
Club Atlético Huracán footballers
San Martín de San Juan footballers